Paul Callery (born 18 April 1950) is a former Australian rules footballer who played for Melbourne, St Kilda and South Melbourne in the Victorian Football League (VFL) during the 1970s.

Callery was a rover and started his career in 1970 with Melbourne, topping their goalkicking in 1971 with 38 goals. He had worked his way into the senior side after impressing in the under-19s where he was a Morrish Medallist. One of the smallest players in the league, Callery crossed to St Kilda in 1974 and went on to play 105 games with the club before finishing his career with a stint at South Melbourne in 1980 which lasted just one game.

External links

1950 births
Living people
Melbourne Football Club players
St Kilda Football Club players
Sydney Swans players
Australian rules footballers from Victoria (Australia)